is a historical text that categorizes and chronologizes the events listed in the Six National Histories.

Notes

Late Old Japanese texts
History books about Japan
Heian period
History books of the Heian Period